Miss World Spain 2022 was the 9th edition of the Miss World Spain pageant. The winner was Paula Pérez Sánchez of Castellón and she represented Spain at Miss World 2022.

Final results

Placements

Challenge Events

Beauty with a Purpose

Public Vote

Regional Costume

Sports

Talent

Top Model

Judges
Francisco Fajardo - President/Head of the Judges
Mireia Lalaguna Royo - Miss World Spain 2015 from Barcelona & Miss World 2015 from Spain
Cuca Miquel
Carlos Pérez Gimeno
Daniel Carnade
David Cabaleiro
Jorge Borrajo
Rachid Mohamed
Andrea Ventulori

Official Delegates
The delegates for Miss World Spain 2022 are:

Notes

Withdrawals
 Huelva
 Melilla

Did not compete
 Aragón
 Canary Islands
 Extremadura
 Galicia

References

External links
 Miss World Spain Official Website

Miss Spain
2022 in Spain
2022 beauty pageants